Maylands is a riverside inner-city suburb approximately  northeast of Perth centred on the Midland railway line on the northern bank of the Swan River.

The suburb was developed during the 1890s and is an administrative locality within the City of Bayswater (having been mostly within the City of Stirling until 1998), bordered by the suburbs of Mount Lawley, East Perth and Bayswater. Maylands railway station provides easy access to the City centre and beyond. The railway line was originally built in the 1880s, and the railway station was extensively refurbished in 2000. Recently a shared bicycle / pedestrian path was built to link Maylands with neighbouring suburbs via the shoreline of the Swan River. There is also a small yacht club and a golf course.

Maylands was once a source of clay for brick and tile making at Maylands Brickworks, and the pits from these activities are now part of a golf course and residential area. It was home to Perth's main airport which serviced many kinds of aircraft and even flying boats until the early 1960s, when the airport moved to Perth Airport. The facilities were then converted to a training area for the Western Australian Police Service.

History
In 1896, the name "Maylands" was first used to identify the area, appearing on a poster advertising a land auction. However the exact reason how the area got its name is something of a mystery. One theory is that Mephan Ferguson (owner of the local foundry) was responsible for naming the area, in honour of his aunt and daughter whom were both named May. Another theory is the area was named by Edgar. W. Hamer (Golds Estates of Australia) after he inspected land in the locality sometime in the month of May.

Historic Peninsula Hotel 

The Peninsula Hotel is located on Railway Parade in Maylands, Perth. The hotel was built in 1906 by well known building contractor, Friederich Wilhelm Gustave Liebe.

Old Maylands Aerodrome

The Maylands Aerodrome was built at Maylands to support West Australian Airways Ltd, which flew the first commercial air service in Australia (before Qantas).

Maylands Airport was where Charles Kingsford Smith made his landing to complete the first non-stop flight across Australia. The first part of the flight Kingsford-Smith described as rather dull, while the second part was made thoroughly unpleasant by a cloud cover their heavy machine couldn't rise out of. For hours they endured the bitter cold and when daylight finally came, they discovered that they had drifted off course to Bunbury,  to the south. After their arrival at Maylands airport they found that summer rains had turned the field more or less into a swamp.

During World War II, Maylands Airfield was requisitioned by the Royal Australian Air Force (RAAF). From February 1942, it was also used by the United States Army Air Forces for refuelling and aircraft ferrying purposes. Between 6 April 1942 and 5 August 1943, No. 35 Squadron, flying Avro Ansons, was based at Maylands to transport supplies and passengers to Allied units throughout Western Australia, as well as supporting the Royal Australian Navy and the Australian Army.

Revitalisation
In December 2009, the City of Bayswater endorsed the Maylands Activity Centre Urban Design Framework following widespread community consultation. The Urban Design Framework provides the strategic direction for the future of the Maylands town centre. This document has been instrumental in guiding the ongoing revitalisation of the Maylands town centre.

Over recent years, Maylands' revitalisation has gathered significant momentum, with a variety of new developments and businesses bringing new residents and vibrancy to the town centre. New bars, cafés and restaurants, along with gourmet food and retail outlets have all contributed to an ongoing transformation of the Maylands town centre into a lively, diverse and inclusive destination.

Maylands continues to evolve as a cultural and creative hub, with the relocation of the Western Australian Ballet to the former Western Australian Institute for the Blind building on Whatley Crescent in 2012. Estudio Nuevo, Studio 281, Swallow Bar and the Maylands Hawkers Markets each provide a variety of music, performance, dance, artistic, cultural and culinary experiences that exemplify Maylands' unique creative and community flavour.

Culture and arts

Western Australian Ballet 
The West Australian Ballet Centre is situated on the historical site of the former Blind Institute in Maylands. The history of the building site dates back to 1897 when the Victoria Institute and the Industrial School for the Blind was developed as a part of the celebrations for the 60th year of Queen Victoria’s reign.

This magnificent building has become a symbol that illustrates Perth’s short history. With its high ceilings, rustic wooded floors, classical charm and character, the building sets a perfect tone for the West Australian Ballet. The building’s disposition provides the artistic team with a creative and innovative backdrop to aid in the creation of world class productions.

Lyric Lane 
The recent Council approval of the Lyric Lane Bar and Café will see the establishment of a purpose-built venue consisting of a bar, cafe and a live music basement, which will provide for new cultural pursuits in the town centre.  The project is now open.

WA Youth Jazz Orchestra 
It has recently been announced that the Western Australian Youth Jazz Orchestra will soon take up residence in the old Maylands Hall at the corner of Eighth Avenue and Guildford Road.

Community

Community groups
A variety of community groups including Creative Maylands, Local Arts and Community Events Inc (LACE), Maylands Residents and Ratepayers Association, Maylands Historical and Peninsula Association (Inc) and Maylands Business Association provide a supportive backbone of active and passionate community members who seek to ensure that the values of the Maylands people are reflected both in its present and future.

Local Arts and Community Events Inc (LACE) 
LACE is the not-for-profit organiser of the Maylands Hawker Markets, and new organiser of the Maylands Street Festival. LACE is about creating free to attend, inclusive community events to help reconnect community.

Creative Maylands 
Since  October 2010, Creative Maylands has been managing and supporting activities that creatively enrich the Maylands neighbourhood. They aim to connect people and ideas to help make Maylands a great place to live, work, and visit.

Maylands Residents and Ratepayers Association

Maylands Business Association 
The association has a strong group of local businesses working together to improve Maylands and make it a destination venue for the community and the promotion of business interests,  The group is active with Council and State Government to help form policies consistent to their vision for Maylands.

Maylands Historical and Peninsula Association (Inc) 
Maylands Historical and Peninsula Association (Inc) was formed in October 1992 at a public meeting held in the Maylands Library. They were promoted by the Maylands Ratepayers and Residents Association and declared the Maylands Historical Society by the Mayor of the City of Stirling.

The Association was officially registered on 1 December 1992, as the Maylands Historical Society Incorporated. On 5 June 2003, they were renamed  the Maylands Historical and Peninsula Association Inc. to reflect their caretaker work at the Old Peninsula Hotel in Maylands, in addition to other historical work.

Community facilities

RISE 

The City of Bayswater's RISE (Recreation, Information, Socialising and Entertainment) was opened in July 2011 and replaced the former Alma Venville Centre with a larger, more contemporary facility. The RISE is a multi purpose community centre that includes a library, gymnasium, cafe, creche, dry courts, function rooms, meeting rooms and a community hall.

Maylands Yacht Club 
The Maylands Yacht Club is located on the Swan River on the Maylands foreshore. The MYC is a family oriented club, with a strong emphasis on enjoyment and helping those who want to learn to sail. The Club sails a variety of classes from the single handed Laser, Sabre and Spiral, to a number of two-handed dinghies including Mirrors and 125s, and the popular trailer-sailer Hartley TS 16.

Maylands Tennis Club 
The Maylands Tennis Club is a boutique grass court club in a secluded location on the Maylands Peninsula, overlooking the Swan River. The Club operates all year round, with 14 grass courts and 3 hard courts (four grass courts over the winter months). The club provides for competitive tennis for players of a wide range of abilities and is renowned for its social activities year-round.

Maylands Cricket Club 
The Maylands Cricket Club is based at De Lacy Reserve. A small community club who function throughout the summer months. Founded in 1958/59 as the Peninsula Cricket Club, before changing to Maylands Peninsula Cricket Club in the 70's before finally being called Maylands Cricket Club in 1989.

Demographics
Maylands' population at the Australian Bureau of Statistics's 2016 census was 12,577. This is an increase on the 12,353 recorded at the 2011 census, 10,448 recorded at the 2006 census, and the 9,721 recorded at the 2001 census. 51.2% of residents are male, and 48.8% are female, compared to the national average of 49.3% male and 50.7% female. The median age is 34, which is below the Western Australian average of 36, and 38.0% of residents over the age of 15 are married, which is below the state average of 48.8%. Out of the suburb's 6,908 dwellings, 5,647 were occupied and 1,261 were not. Out of the 5,647 occupied dwellings, 1,742 were detached houses, 1,948 were semi-detached and 1,936 were apartments or flats. The proportion of apartments or flats, 34.3%, is significantly above the state average of 5.7%. 984 were owned outright, 1,723 were owned with a mortgage, 2,778 were rented and 156 were other or not stated. The proportion of dwellings rented, 49.2%, is significantly above the state average of 28.3%.

The median weekly household income was $1,449, which is lower than the state, which is at $1,595, but slightly above that of the nation as a whole, at $1,438. Major industries that residents worked in were hospitals (4.5%), cafes and restaurants (4.4%), state government administration (3.3%), iron ore mining (2.2%) and computer system design and related services (2.1%).

The population of Maylands is predominantly Australian born, with 49.8% of residents born in Australia, although this is below the state average of 60.3%. The next-most-common birthplaces are India (6.5%), England (6.1%), New Zealand (2.4%), Ireland (1.6%) and China, excluding Taiwan and special administrative regions (1.3%). 28.2% of residents had both parents born in Australia, and 51.1% had neither parent born in Australia. The most popular religious affiliations were none (35.8%), Catholic (19.9%), Anglican (7.9%) and Hinduism (5.1%).

Education

The only school in Maylands is Maylands Peninsula Primary School, a public primary school with approximately 670 students from Kindergarten to year 6. It opened in 2004 as an amalgamation of Maylands Primary School and East Maylands Primary School. Maylands Primary School was the first school in Maylands, opening in 1903. East Maylands Primary School was established in 1954. The former site of Maylands Primary School is now used by the Constable Care Safety School.

There are no secondary schools in Maylands, but the suburb is within the local intake areas of John Forrest Secondary College and Mount Lawley Senior High School.

Maylands is also home to the Western Australian Department of Education's Instrumental Music School Services, which provides instrumental music services to public schools in Western Australia, including instrumental teachers, curricula, instrument loans and other services for the provision of music lessons at schools.

See also
 Albany Bell Castle

References

 
Suburbs of Perth, Western Australia
Suburbs in the City of Bayswater